Schneiderberget is a mountain at Edgeøya, Svalbard. It is located at the eastern side of Tjuvfjorden, and southeast of Tjuvfjordlaguna. The mountain is named after Norwegian zoologist Hans Jakob Sparre Schneider.

References

Mountains of Edgeøya